A pinch grip tie, or an over-under bodylock, is a clinch hold and stand-up grappling position that is an extension of the over-under position, but having both hands locked behind the opponents back. The hands are typically locked with a palm-to-palm grip, palm-to-wrist grip or fingers-to-fingers grip. The pinch grip tie can be used to throw the opponent, but usually the grapplers attempt to obtain a better hold such as double underhooks or double collar tie. The pinch grip tie is often a neutral position when both grapplers symmetrically have the same hold on each other.

See also
 Bear hug
 Collar-and-elbow position
 Double collar tie
 Double underhooks

References

 Danaher, John; Gracie, Renzo. Two Approaches to Fighting in the Clinch. Retrieved February 11, 2006.
 Pedreira, Roberto. Science of Muay Thai Clinch The Subtle Science of the Muay Thai Clinch]. Retrieved February 1, 2006.

Grappling positions
Wrestling